Strikes Back is a 1987 album by Héctor Lavoe. The album was the only time Lavoe was nominated for a Grammy Award.

Track listing
"Loco" (arrangements by Marty Sheller)	Tommy Sánchez	5:23
"Ponce" (arrangements by Louie Cruz)	Tommy Sánchez	6:14
"Taxi" (arrangements by Javier Vásquez)	Public Domain	3:45
"Como No Voy A Llorar" (arrangements by Louie Cruz)	Ricardo Nuñez	6:36
"Ella Mintió" (arrangements by Louie Ramírez)	Diego Verdaguer / Amanda Miguel / G. Carballo	4:45
"En El Fiando" (arrangements by Isidro Infante)	Johnny Ortiz	5:22
"Escarcha" (arrangements by Marty Sheller)	Johnny Ortiz	5:36
"Plato de Segunda Mesa" (Arreglos musicales por: Marty Sheller)	C. Curet Alonso	4:35

References

Héctor Lavoe albums
1987 albums
Fania Records albums